The Gorbals is an area in the city of Glasgow, Scotland, on the south bank of the River Clyde. By the late 19th century, it had become densely populated; rural migrants and immigrants were attracted by the new industries and employment opportunities of Glasgow. At its peak, during the 1930s, the wider Gorbals district (which includes the directly adjoined localities of Laurieston and Hutchesontown) had swollen in population to an estimated 90,000 residents. Along with its relatively small size, this gave the area a very high population density of around 40,000/km². Redevelopment after WWII has taken many turns, and the area's population is substantially smaller today. The Gorbals was also home to 16 high rise flat blocks, now only 6 of them are standing in 2023 and 2 of them are set to come down in the next couple of years.

Meaning of placename
The name is first documented in the 15th and 16th centuries as Gorbaldis, and its etymology is unclear. It may be related to the Ecclesiastical Latin word  ('sheaf'), found in the Scottish Gaelic term  ('tenth sheaf'), a tithe of corn given to a parish rector. The placename would therefore mean 'the Sheaves'. The name is similar to a Lowland Scots word /// ('unfledged bird'), perhaps a reference to lepers who were allowed to beg for alms in public. ('garden of the town') conforms with certain suggestions made by A.G. Callant in 1888, but other interpretations are also popular.

The village of Gorbals, known once as Bridgend, being at the south end of the bridge over the Clyde towards Glasgow Cross, had been pastoral with some early trading and mining. The Industrial Revolution, thanks to the inventions of James Watt and others, stimulated major expansion of Glasgow. In 1846 the city absorbed Gorbals, with a population of some 3,000, and with cotton spinning and weaving factories, ironworks and engineering. Increasingly in the 19th and 20th centuries, the area became home to large numbers of migrants from the surrounding countryside, including the Scottish Highlands and rural Ireland, and immigrants from Italy, Eastern and Central Europe, to meet the needs of industrial capital.

History

Govan parish was one of the oldest possessions of the church in the region. The merk land of "Brigend and Gorbaldis" is referred to in several sources. The village of Brigend was named after the bridge which Bishop William Rae had built in 1345 over the River Clyde; it lasted until the 19th century. Lady Marjorie Stewart of Lochow was said to have had a hospital built for lepers and dedicated to St Ninian in 1350, although this year is contested by current historians' estimates dating her life and activities.  The lands on which the hospital was built were named St Ninian's Croft. They were later incorporated into Hutchesontown.

After the Protestant Reformation, in 1579 the church granted the land for ground rents (feued the land) to Sir George Elphinstone, a merchant who was Provost of Glasgow (1600–1606). The barony and regality of the Gorbals was confirmed in 1606 by a charter of King James VI, which vested Elphinstone's son, also George, and his descendants. These powers descended to Sir Robert Douglas of Blackerstone, who in 1650 disponed (legally transferred) the Gorbals to Glasgow's magistrates for the benefit of the city, the Trades' House, and Hutchesons' Hospital. The magistrates from then on collected the rents and duties and divided them: one fourth to the city, one fourth to the Trades' House, and the remaining half to Hutchesons' Hospital.

In 1790 the lands were divided into lots for development; the city acquired the old feus of Gorbals and Bridgend, and also the Kingston portion of the Barony of Gorbals. The Trades' House obtained a western section; and the remaining section lying to the east and south was allocated to Hutchesons' Hospital. The Hutcheson's Trust sub-feud a portion of their lands to an ambitious builder, James Laurie. (His grave, along with those of many other builders of Gorbals, is marked with well-carved masons' implements, indicating his Master status. The gravestones are visible at the Burial Ground, established in 1715 and now called the Gorbals Rose Garden). Laurie built the first house in St Ninian Street in 1794.

The districts are now known as the Gorbals, Laurieston, Tradeston, Kingston and Hutchesontown. The Little Govan estate, including a small village of the same name, were replaced by the eastern parts of Hutchesontown and Oatlands. The Gorbals was a successful industrial suburb in the late 19th century, and attracted many Protestant and Catholic immigrants from Ireland, especially from Ulster (in particular from County Donegal), and Italy, as well as Jewish immigrants from the Russian Empire and Eastern Europe. At one time most of the Jews in Scotland resided in this area. Industrial decay and over-population overwhelmed the area, which became a centre of poverty in the early 20th century. Gorbals railway station opened on 1 September 1877. Changes in the area meant a decrease in business, and it closed to passengers permanently on 1 June 1928.

In the 1870s, the City Improvement Trust cleared away the old Gorbals village and redeveloped the area to form the new Gorbals Cross, at the same time developing new workers' tenements around the former Oatlands Square.

Much of the early Gorbals village was replaced by modern tenements in the street grid system being adopted in the city centre and notably in the south side including neighbouring Tradeston, Kinning Park and Hutchesontown. Along the riverside the classical terraces of Laurieston had taken shape.
  
By 1914 the population of Gorbals and Hutchesontown was working locally and in commerce in the city centre, factories and warehouses nearby of carpetmaking, garment making, food manufacturing, ironworks, chemical works, railways, docks, shipping, construction and engineering; supporting some 16 schools, 15 churches, three synagogues, swimming baths and libraries, and a range of picture-houses, dance halls and two theatres. One theatre, the Royal Princess's, is the Citizens Theatre today. Of its 19,000 houses 48% were now classed as overcrowded. To remedy over-crowding and lack of facilities within houses, local authority housing started in the 1920s on new areas being brought in by the city's expansion of boundaries. Between 1921 and 1951 the population of Gorbals and Hutchesontown fell by 21%. By 1964 there were 12,200 houses.

As with London and other major cities, in the post-war planning of the 1950s Glasgow Corporation decided to demolish many inner districts including Gorbals and Huchesontown, with families being dispersed to new outlying housing estates such as Castlemilk, in overspill agreements with New Towns such as East Kilbride, and others rehoused within the area but in huge concrete multi-storey towers. With its grid network of tenements facing directly onto the street, the neighbouring Govanhill district to the south (whose residents observed the demolition/modernisation in nearby areas such as the Gorbals and Pollokshaws with suspicion and successfully opposed the same fate befalling their homes, although they faced other challenges to improve their living conditions) offers some reminder of how the district used to look prior to its redevelopment. From the late 1990s, terraces of tenements in the modern style started to return and in the 21st century most of the concrete tower blocks have been demolished.

Glasgow Corporation's replacement of old, outdated and crowded housing with new high-rise towers of social housing in the 1960s greatly improved conditions but had social consequences. Lack of awareness of the effects of concentrating families resulted in poor design, and the low-quality construction of the concrete, 20-storey flats led to innumerable social and health problems among the residents. Many of the blocks developed mould and structural problems. Their designs prevented residents from visually controlling their internal and external spaces, adding to issues of social dysfunction. The Queen Elizabeth Square flats, designed by Sir Basil Spence, were demolished in 1993 to make way for a new generation of housing development.

In 2004, Glasgow Housing Association announced plans to demolish more of the decaying high-rise blocks, and to comprehensively refurbish and re-clad others. Two of the Area D blocks (Caledonia Road), as well as the entire Area E (Sandiefield) and Laurieston (Stirlingfauld / Norfolk Court) high-rise estates, were demolished between 2002 and 2016. In 2021, it was announced that the two remaining Area D multi storey blocks would also be condemned, meaning that the Area B or "Riverside" estate, designed by Robert Matthew, will be the only high-rise flats left in the Gorbals. New housing has been developed at lower density, with design elements to encourage residents' and public safety.

Much of the area, particularly Hutchesontown, was comprehensively redeveloped for a third time, providing a mix of private (market rate) and social housing. Earlier phases of this recent redevelopment tended toward yellow-brick reinterpretations of traditional tenements, in a post-modern style. More recent phases, masterplanned by Piers Gough, have employed noted modern architects such as Page/Park, Elder & Cannon and CZWG, resulting in more bold and radical designs, accompanied by innovative street plans and high-quality landscaping. They incorporated many pieces of public art. The Gorbals Leisure Centre opened in January 2000, and the number of shopping facilities in the area is on the rise. In 2005, fire destroyed the Catholic Church of Blessed John Duns Scotus as a result of a fallen candle. The church was restored and reopened for worship in September 2010. With much of the Hutchesontown area of the Gorbals improved, the urban and social-regeneration program expanded into the neighbouring Laurieston area to the west.

In the early 2000s, a local heritage group started a campaign to reinstate the cross fountain, aided by people attracted to their Facebook page, Old Gorbals Pictures (Heritage Group). The group have discovered that a copy of the original cross fountain was installed on the Caribbean island of St Kitts & Nevis. They are working to engage professional help to digitally scan this object to allow for the manufacture of 'Gorbals Cross, No 3', to be installed in a new development near to where it originally stood.

Since 1945, the Citizens Theatre has been based in the area at the former Royal Princess's Theatre, an historic Victorian building. The area also has a local newspaper Local News for Southsiders. The area is served by Bridge Street and West Street subway stations and numerous bus routes.

A controversial pub in the district is the Brazen Head, located at the northern end of Cathcart Road and one of few buildings to survive the mid-20th century redevelopment. Formerly a railway pub known as the Granite City, much of its clientele is Celtic F.C. supporters and has been associated with Irish Republicanism. Nearby is the architectural masterpiece of the Caledonia Road Church, Category A-listed mid-Victorian structure of remaining walls and tower designed by Alexander "Greek" Thomson.

Historical maps
A large selection of historical maps of the Gorbals is available from the National Library of Scotland.

Notable natives and residents

 Jimmy Boyle (b. 1944), convicted criminal, novelist and sculptor
 Ian Brady, (1938–2017; born in the Gorbals and named Ian Duncan Stewart); notable as the Moors murderer.
 Frank Bruno, the boxer, moved to the Gorbals to live with his partner in 2012.
 Lawrence Chaney (b. 1996), drag queen and winner of the second series of RuPaul's Drag Race UK
 Paddy Connolly (b. 1970), football player and coach
 Owen Coyle (b, 1966), football player and manager
 Paddy Crerand (b. 1939), football player and MUTV pundit (Celtic and Manchester United)
 Tommy Docherty (1928–2020), football player and manager (Celtic, Preston North End, and Chelsea)
 Carol Ann Duffy (b. 1955), Poet Laureate of the UK
 Hannah Frank (1908–2008), artist and sculptor 
 Ralph Glasser (1916–2002), psychologist and economist, writer of a three-volume autobiography, beginning with Growing up in the Gorbals
 Alex Harvey (1935–1982), musician
 Alexander Watson Hutton (1853–1936), a teacher and sportsman; considered the father of Argentine football, as he established teams there
 Lorraine Kelly (b. 1959), television presenter, journalist and actress 
 Helena Kennedy (b. 1950), Labour member of the House of Lords
 John Kurila (1941–2018) footballer who played briefly for Celtic F.C. as well as playing for Northampton Town and other English and Canadian clubs.
 Sir Thomas Lipton (1848–1931), grocery mogul, founder of Lipton's Tea, and perennial contender for the sailing world's America's Cup.
 Benny Lynch (1913–1946), boxer, became the British, European and World Flyweight Champion.
 Hugh MacColl (1861–1915), footballer, founder and first captain of Spanish Sevilla F.C. in 1890; this is considered to be Spain's oldest football club solely devoted to association football.
 Gerry McAloon (1916 – 1987), football player with Brentford F.C., Wolverhampton Wanderers F.C., Celtic F.C. and Belfast Celtic F.C.
 Michael McGurk (1958–2009), born here and moved to Australia, where he became a businessman; he was murdered outside his Sydney family home.
 Gerry McLauchlan (b. 1989), formerly resident of Bishopbriggs, former footballer with Brechin City and Ayr United 
 John Maclean (1879–1923), socialist politician; stood for election in the area in the 1918 general election.
 Frank McLintock (b. 1939), football player and pundit (Arsenal)
 John Martyn (b. 1948), musician
 Robert Millar (b. 1958), cyclist, the first English-speaking "King of the Mountains" champion in the Tour de France (1984)
 Allan Pinkerton (1819–1884), born and raised here; he achieved fame in the United States by establishing Pinkerton's detective agency.
 "Jock" Ross (b. 1943), the founder of the Australian outlaw Comanchero Motorcycle Club.
 Phil (b. 1937) and Derek Shulman (b. 1947), born here, these brothers became musicians; performed with the 1970s British progressive rock band Gentle Giant. 
 John Spencer (Scottish footballer) (b. 1970), football player and manager
 Joe Yule (1892–1950), stage comedian and father of actor Mickey Rooney

Representation in other media
 The song Cod Liver Oil and the Orange Juice, by Hamish Imlach, mentions the Gorbals.
 The novel No Mean City (1935) is set in the Gorbals.
 The ballet Miracle in the Gorbals (1944), with choreography by Robert Helpmann and music by Arthur Bliss, is set there.
 Robert McLeish's play The Gorbals Story (1946) is set there. Originally produced by the Glasgow Unity Theatre, it was adapted as a 1950 film by the same name.
 Edwin Morgan set his poem "Glasgow Sonnet" in the Gorbals.
 Oscar Marzaroli explored life in the Gorbals in the 1960s in his photographs, notably in his collection Shades of Grey – Glasgow 1956-1987
 "The Jeely Piece Song" – a children’s' street song expressed profound change in the area's way of life.
 Colin MacFarlane's autobiography, The Real Gorbals Story: True Tales from Glasgow's Meanest Streets (Edinburgh 2007), describes growing up in the 1960s in Gorbals
 A scene in the promotional documentary short The Frasers' Return (1962), directed by Harvey Harrison, was shot in Gorbals council housing.
 John Buchan's novel Huntingtower (1922) was adapted in 1978 as a popular BBC TV series of the same name, featuring the Gorbals Die-Hards. The setting was changed from Carrick in southwest Scotland to Glasgow.
 The novel Swing Hammer Swing! (1992) by Jeff Torrington, decades in the writing, is set in the Gorbals.
 The character Kristine Kochanski in the British TV series Red Dwarf grew up there. (1997).
 The television special Blackadder's Christmas Carol refers to the Gorbals in a scene in which Prince Albert (played by Jim Broadbent) claims to be Glaswegian.
 The BBC documentary Poor Kids (2011) tells the story of a 10-year-old girl living in a mouldy, high-rise council flat in the Gorbals. The high rise is demolished during the filming of the documentary.
 Top Chef Season 2 winner Ilan Hall named his first restaurant "The Gorbals" (in Los Angeles) after his immigrant Russian-Jewish father's neighbourhood in Glasgow.
 In BBC comedy series The Thick of It, the main character Malcolm Tucker is called the "Gorbals Goebbels".

See also
 Southern Necropolis, a burial ground in the Gorbals

References

External links

Gorbals Heritage Environment Trust
Gorbals history – Clyde Waterfront Heritage
National Library of Scotland: SCOTTISH SCREEN ARCHIVE (archive films relating to the Gorbals)
Gorbals - Origins and History
Greater Gorbals profile at Understanding Glasgow
The Gorbals: A New Glasgow Suburb at Pat's Guide to Glasgow West End

 
Areas of Glasgow
Housing estates in Glasgow
Irish diaspora in Scotland
Jews and Judaism in Scotland
Burghs